Remembrance of Tivoli (Italian - Ricordo di Tivoli) is a painting by the German artist Anselm Feuerbach, produced during his 1866 stay in Rome. It shows two Italian peasant children in Tivoli. It is now in the Alte Nationalgalerie in Berlin.

References

1866 paintings
Paintings in the collection of the Alte Nationalgalerie
Musical instruments in art
Water in art
Paintings by Anselm Feuerbach